Bear Creek is a census-designated place in Merced County, California. The population was 273 at the 2020 United States census, down from 290 at the 2010 census.

History
A post office operated at Bear Creek from 1871 to 1872.

Geography
According to the United States Census Bureau, the CDP covers an area of 0.1 square miles (0.1 km), all of it land.

Demographics

At the 2010 census Bear Creek had a population of 290. The racial makeup of Bear Creek was 156 (53.8%) White, 4 (1.4%) African American, 2 (0.7%) Native American, 14 (4.8%) Asian, 0 (0.0%) Pacific Islander, 93 (32.1%) from other races, and 21 (7.2%) from two or more races. Hispanic or Latino of any race were 170 people (58.6%).

The whole population lived in households, no one lived in non-institutionalized group quarters and no one was institutionalized.

There were 82 households, 38 (46.3%) had children under the age of 18 living in them, 31 (37.8%) were opposite-sex married couples living together, 19 (23.2%) had a female householder with no husband present, 11 (13.4%) had a male householder with no wife present.  There were 10 (12.2%) unmarried opposite-sex partnerships, and 0 (0%) same-sex married couples or partnerships. 14 households (17.1%) were one person and 6 (7.3%) had someone living alone who was 65 or older. The average household size was 3.54.  There were 61 families (74.4% of households); the average family size was 4.02.

The age distribution was 89 people (30.7%) under the age of 18, 49 people (16.9%) aged 18 to 24, 68 people (23.4%) aged 25 to 44, 64 people (22.1%) aged 45 to 64, and 20 people (6.9%) who were 65 or older.  The median age was 27.0 years. For every 100 females, there were 132.0 males.  For every 100 females age 18 and over, there were 118.5 males.

There were 90 housing units at an average density of 1,570.6 per square mile, of the occupied units 26 (31.7%) were owner-occupied and 56 (68.3%) were rented. The homeowner vacancy rate was 0%; the rental vacancy rate was 6.6%.  91 people (31.4% of the population) lived in owner-occupied housing units and 199 people (68.6%) lived in rental housing units.

References

Census-designated places in Merced County, California
Census-designated places in California